The Bibliothèque Fesch is the municipal library of Ajaccio, in Corsica.

It is named after the Musée Fesch (Fesch Palace), of which it occupies the north wing.

Inaugurated on May 14, 1850, it was founded by Lucien Bonaparte in 1801 with an endowment of 12,310 books. With rare or even unique works, it has been listed as a Historic Monument since 13 September 13, 2011.

The library consists of three rooms, one of which is accessible to the public. The woodwork, shelving and reading tables are in walnut.

In 2019, the site was selected for the second edition of the heritage lottery.

References

External links
Page on the library in Catalogue collectif de France (CCFr).

Public libraries in France
Buildings and structures in Corse-du-Sud
Education in Corsica
Libraries established in 1850